Labron E. Harris (November 26, 1908 – August 14, 1995) was an American professional golfer and golf coach at Oklahoma State University from 1947 to 1973. He coached Oklahoma State to 24 Missouri Valley and Big 8 Conference championships and the 1963 NCAA Division I Golf Championship. He coached 27 All-Americans and two NCAA champions, Earl Moeller in 1953 and Grier Jones in 1968.

Harris also was the architect of Lakeside Golf Course in 1945. Lakeside served as the home golf course and training facility for the Oklahoma State University golf teams for almost 50 years. Harris was the head golf professional from 1945 to his retirement in 1973.

Harris was inducted into the Oklahoma Sports Hall of Fame in 1994.

His son, Labron Harris Jr., is a professional golfer who won on the PGA Tour.

Coaching victories
Big Eight Conference (15) 1958-59-60-61-62-63-64-65-66-67-69-70-71-72-73
Missouri Valley Conference (9) 1947-48-49-50-51-52-53-54-55
Oklahoma Intercollegiate (13) 1960-61-62-64-65-66-67-68-69-70-71-72-73
Cowboy Invitational (4) 1970-71-72-73
OU Sooner Invitational (3) 1970-72-73
Wichita State Invitational (3) 1970-72-73
Pan American Invitational (1) 1954
NCAA Division I Men's Golf Championships (1) 1963
All-American Intercollegiate (1) 1964
Pikes Peak Intercollegiate (1) 1964
Midwestern Collegiate (1) 1970
Kansas Invitational (1) 1970
Kansas State Invitational (1) 1970
Tulsa Invitational (1) 1971
Morris Williams Intercollegiate (1) 1971
All College (1) 1972
Big Eight Fall Invitational (1) 1972

Tournament wins
this list is incomplete
1950 Iowa Open
1953 Oklahoma Open
1958 Waterloo Open Golf Classic

References

External links
 Encyclopedia of Oklahoma History and Culture - Harris, Labron

American male golfers
American golf instructors
Golfers from Oklahoma
Oklahoma State Cowboys golf coaches
1908 births
1995 deaths